These are the Official Charts Company's UK Independent Singles Chart number-one singles of 2017.

Chart history

Number-one Indie artists

See also
List of UK Dance Singles Chart number ones of 2017
List of UK R&B Singles Chart number ones of 2017
List of UK Rock & Metal Singles Chart number ones of 2017
List of UK Independent Albums Chart number ones of 2017

References

External links
Indie Singles Top 40 at the Official Charts Company
UK Top 30 Indie Singles Chart at BBC Radio 1

2017 in British music
United Kingdom Indie Singles
Indie 2017